Luis Arturo Swisher Salguero (born 21 June 1978) is a former Guatemalan football defender.

Club career
Swisher started his professional career with Aurora F.C. making his debut with the club in 1997. He then played for some other local teams before he joined Polish side Polonia Warszawa from CD Suchitepéquez in June 2005, after several exceptional years in Guatemala. He lasted only one season in Europe and returned to Suchitepéquez only to play for four different teams in the next four seasons. After joining Petapa in 2009 he moved to USAC before the 2009–2010 season. In March 2010, his former club Jalapa were deducted 6 points for breach of contract after not paying the salaries of Swisher and Maynor Dávila. In June 2013, Swisher announces his retirement from professional football, making USAC his last team. Worked as a coach for the New York Red Bulls Academy and currently is the head coach of U17 St. Louis City SC.

International career
Swisher made his debut for Guatemala in a January 2000 friendly match against Panama and has, as of January 2010, earned a total of 23 caps, scoring no goals. He has represented his country in 9 FIFA World Cup qualification matches as well as at the 2002 CONCACAF Gold Cup. He then was not considered for the national team by Ramón Maradiaga for four years before returning to the squad in 2006 and to play at the 2007 CONCACAF Gold Cup. He also played at the UNCAF Nations Cup 2001.

Management
Swisher was named head coach of FC Boulder of the USL Premier Development League for the 2017 season. 
 2017 USL PDL Season Second Place (Mountain Division)
In June 2018 Swisher was appointed as the new coach of Saint Louis FC U19, bronze medalist finish on the 2018/19 season of the U.S. Soccer Development Academy

External links

References

1978 births
Living people
Sportspeople from Guatemala City
Association football defenders
Guatemalan footballers
Guatemalan expatriate footballers
Guatemala international footballers
2001 UNCAF Nations Cup players
2007 CONCACAF Gold Cup players
Aurora F.C. players
Comunicaciones F.C. players
Universidad de San Carlos players
Cobán Imperial players
C.D. Suchitepéquez players
Polonia Warsaw players
Xelajú MC players
Ekstraklasa players
Expatriate footballers in Poland
Guatemalan expatriate sportspeople in Poland
Copa Centroamericana-winning players
Antigua GFC players
Guatemalan people of Swiss descent
Deportivo Petapa players